De León or de León or De Leon may refer to:

De Leon, Texas, USA
De Leon Independent School District of De Leon, Texas
Manuel Márquez de León International Airport, the airport serving La Paz, Baja California Sur, Mexico
De León (surname), people with the surname De León, de León or De Leon